Viktor Valeriyovych Bliznichenko (born 29 September 2002) is a Ukrainian professional footballer who plays as a defensive midfielder for Inhulets Petrove on loan from Dynamo Kyiv.

Career

Early years
Born in Novohrad-Volynskyi, Brazhko began his career at Dnipro from the homonymous city and then continued in the Dynamo Kyiv academy.

Dynamo Kyiv
He played in the Ukrainian Premier League Reserves and never made his debut for the senior Dynamo Kyiv squad.

Loan to Inhulets Petrove
In July 2022 Bliznichenko signed a two-year loan contract with Ukrainian Premier League side Inhulets Petrove and made his league debut for the club as a starting-squad player in a home match against Oleksandriya on 25 August 2022.

Personal life
Viktor Bliznichenko is a younger brother of another Ukrainian footballer, Andriy Bliznichenko.

References

External links
 
 

2002 births
Living people
People from Zviahel
Sportspeople from Zhytomyr Oblast
Ukrainian footballers
Ukraine youth international footballers
Association football midfielders
FC Dynamo Kyiv players
FC Inhulets Petrove players
Ukrainian Premier League players